Carlo Loffredo, C.R. (31 March 1635 – January 1701) was a Roman Catholic prelate who served as Archbishop of Capua (1698–1701), Archbishop of Bari-Canosa (1691–1698), and Bishop of Molfetta (1670–1691).

Biography
Carlo Loffredo was born in Cardito, Italy on 31 March 1635 and ordained a priest in the Congregation of Clerics Regular of the Divine Providence.
On 6 October 1670, he was appointed during the papacy of Pope Clement X as Bishop of Molfetta.
On 19 October 1670, he was consecrated bishop by Benedetto Odescalchi, Cardinal-Priest of Sant'Onofrio, with Domenico de' Marini, Titular Archbishop of Teodosia, and Tommaso d'Aquino, Bishop of Sessa Aurunca, serving as co-consecrators. 
On 26 November 1691, he was appointed during the papacy of Pope Innocent XII as Archbishop of Bari-Canosa.
On 10 March 1698, he was appointed during the papacy of Pope Clement XI as Archbishop of Capua.
He served as Archbishop of Capua until his death in January 1701.

Episcopal succession
While bishop, he was the principal co-consecrator of:

References

External links and additional sources
 (for Chronology of Bishops) 
 (for Chronology of Bishops) 
 (for Chronology of Bishops) 
 (for Chronology of Bishops) 
 (for Chronology of Bishops) 
 (for Chronology of Bishops) 

18th-century Italian Roman Catholic bishops
17th-century Italian Roman Catholic bishops
Bishops appointed by Pope Clement X
Bishops appointed by Pope Innocent XII
Bishops appointed by Pope Clement XI
1635 births
1701 deaths
Theatine bishops
Bishops of Molfetta